Mateo is a 2014 Colombian drama film directed by Maria Gamboa and starring Carlos Hernández. It was selected as the Colombian entry for the Best Foreign Language Film at the 87th Academy Awards, but was not nominated.

Cast
 Carlos Hernández
 Felipe Botero
 Samuel Lazcano

See also
 List of submissions to the 87th Academy Awards for Best Foreign Language Film
 List of Colombian submissions for the Academy Award for Best Foreign Language Film

References

External links
 

2014 films
2014 drama films
2010s Spanish-language films
Colombian drama films
2010s Colombian films